Conceptismo (literally, conceptism) is a literary movement of the Baroque period in the Spanish literature. It began in the late 16th century and lasted through the 17th century, also the period of the Spanish Golden Age.

Conceptismo is characterized by a rapid rhythm, directness, simple vocabulary, witty metaphors, and wordplay. In this style, multiple meanings are conveyed in a very concise manner, and conceptual intricacies are emphasised over elaborate vocabulary.

Definition 
A major theorist of the movement, Baltasar Gracián, in his work Agudeza y arte de ingenio, defined "concept" as "an act of the understanding that expresses the correspondence between objects". Conceptismo is characterized by a search for conciseness of expression with maximum significance in as few words as possible (mot juste), especially in a way that suggests various meanings, as long as it is relevant to the theme of the work.

Conceptismo works with the meanings of words and their relationships, often in the service of rhetoric. The most common means of achieving this are ellipsis, zeugma, amphibology, polysemy, antithesis, equivocation, parody, or puns.

In line with other baroque styles, conceptismo upheld the aesthetic value of the difficulties of language, thus Gracián declared:"La verdad, cuanto más dificultosa, es más agradable, y el conocimiento que cuesta es más estimado."

"Truth, when it is more difficult, is more pleasant, and knowledge that costs is more valued."The most prominent writer of Castilian conceptismo is Francisco de Quevedo, who wrote with an ironic style and satirical wit.  Other adherents of this style include Baltasar Gracián.

Contrast with culteranismo 
Conceptismo contrasts starkly with culteranismo, another movement of the Baroque period, which is characterized by ostentatious vocabulary, complex syntactical order, multiple, complicated metaphors, but highly conventional content.

To rephrase, where conceptismo values few words with high significance, culteranismo values elaborate vocabulary with relative significance. They both are concerned with what Gracián identified as the value of the difficulty of language.

One should not assume conceptismo is simpler than culteranismo because of its simpler vocabulary—conceptismo disguises its complexity through a variety of techniques, some of which are listed above. Likewise, one should not assume culteranismo is less meaningful or profound than conceptismo because it emphasizes the "exterior" of the work—it can be equally as meaningful as conceptismo, and it is simply a matter of whether the meaning is revealed in the "exterior" or "interior" of the work.

The best-known representative of Spanish culteranismo, Luis de Góngora, had an ongoing feud with Francisco de Quevedo in which they each criticized the other's writing and personal life.

References

Spanish literature
Baroque literature
Spanish Baroque
Literary movements

de:Schwulststil#Marinismus im italienischen Barock und Konzettismus in Spanien